Super East Java derby is the name given in football rivalries to any match between two Indonesian football clubs: Arema (Galatama) and Persebaya Surabaya (Perserikatan). The fierce competition between both teams began in 1992 when Arema and Persebaya Surabaya were grouped together in group A of 1992 Piala Utama (Premier Cup).

Arema and Persebaya Surabaya were established on different era, at which Arema was formed in 1987, while Persebaya in 1927. Both teams have groups of fans who are equally well-known fanatics, namely Aremania (Arema) and Bonek (Persebaya Surabaya). Both fans have also been known for their psywar, conducted throughout the game, making the rivalrous match much awaited.

History

The atmosphere on the first meeting between Arema and Persebaya was mediocre, most probably as a result of both teams playing on different competitions. Persebaya was competing in Perserikatan, while Arema participated in Galatama.

Initially, the feud was not between Arema and Persebaya. In fact, Persebaya rival was Persema Malang in Perserikatan, whereas Arema were against Mitra Surabaya (formerly known as Niac Mitra) in Galatama.

The situation had changed since Perserikatan and Galatama were merged into Liga Indonesia in 1994. Although Persema and Mitra Surabaya were still in the competition at that time, Persebaya and Arema were gaining much attention from their fans. Therefore, the East Java derby began.

As time has gone by, Persema's achievement was no better than Arema and Mitra Surabaya was disbanded. As a result, many football fans had decided to support Arema and Persebaya instead. Because the competition between the two teams is remarkably intense, Arema and Persebaya have to be separated into different region groups (east and west) in the league. It was intended to avoid friction between fans in the event of the derby. The East Java derby remains inevitable in absence of the region separation system, however. A joint agreement signed in 1988 forbade the two fan groups from meeting in a stadium, although it was rarely practiced.

On 1 October 2022, at least 135 people were killed in a stampede inside the stadium.

Incidents

Kantata Takwa concert 
On 23 January 1990, Iwan Fals launched the Kantata Takwa album in Tambaksari Stadium, the previous homebase of Persebaya. In the first of 30 minutes at this concert, Bonek fans felt upset because the festival area was occupied by Aremania, which made pro-Arema chants. Nevertheless, the Aremania keep trying to defend themselves in the festival area, although the Bonek tried to throw out the Aremania from the concert.  After the concert ended, riots broke out outside the stadium, which continues to occur until Gubeng train station.

Sepultura's Indonesia tour 
In July 1992, Sepultura, a Brazilian heavy metal band, took part in a series of world tour concerts in Indonesia by holding a roadshow at Jakarta and Surabaya. The Surabaya roadshow was hosted at the Tambaksari Stadium, the venue of the Iwan Fals' concert two years prior. In return for the of the Iwan Fals concert, the Bonek fans occupied the festival area and dispelled the arrival of Aremania from the Tambaksari Stadium to watch the concert. Riots also broke out outside the stadium.

Nurkiman's incident 
On 26 December 1995, Persebaya played an away match against Persema Malang. The match ended with a draw score, 1–1. On the way home to Surabaya, Persema's fans, the Ngalamania, threw rocks into Persebaya's buses. The rocks damaged the mirror of the bus, resulting in permanent left eye blindness to Nurkiman, Persebaya's attacking midfielder, that affected their ultimately victorious 1996/1997 season.

Aremania's awaydays in Surabaya 
On 15 November 1997, Arema played an away match against Persebaya in Tambaksari Stadium, with the Aremania occupying the VIP tribune with police escort. The match took place safely without any on-stadium incidents; apart from a brawl between the Bonek and the Mitra's fans against Aremania and Ngalamania. As the host, Bonek also made several chants critical of the referee.

Asuemper case 
On 4 September 2006, the second leg of a Copa Indonesia quarter-finals match between Persebaya against Arema in Tambaksari Stadium ended with a draw score, 1–1, knocking Persebaya out of the semi-finals as the club had lost in the previous leg held in Malang.

This resulted in a riot called as "Asuemper" ("Amuk Suporter Empat September" – "September Fourth Supporters Riots"), one of the biggest fan riots in East Java and Indonesian football history, until the 2022 Kanjuruhan Stadium disaster. In the riots, the Bonek burned three cars, and injured 14 in the riots including 13 police officers.

Kanjuruhan Stadium disaster 

The deadliest incident in the Super East Java derby history occurred in Kanjuruhan Stadium on 1 October 2022, when Persebaya won Arema 3–2 at the end of the match. After the police took harsh measures on some spectators, who take photos with Arema players, approximately 3,000 Arema fans invaded the pitch and wreaked havoc along their way, causing Persebaya's players to hide inside police armored personal carriers before they could leave the stadium. Indonesian police tackled the situation using tear gas in order to dispersed the fans, but the situation worsened when tear gas being trapped in wind conditions, asphyxiating Arema fans invading the pitch. According to official police accounts, the tear gas caused the Arema fans to rush for the single exit point, resulting in a stampede and further asphxiations along the way.

Early reports stated that the disaster caused 182 fatalities, with later reports showing 131 fatalities, and final report from Muhadjir Effendy showed that the fatalities count was 125. However, according to Malang Regency government's Postmortem Crisis Center Post, their fatalities count was initially 133, but their final report stated that the fatalities count was 131. Confirmed casualties from police reports were 125 Arema fans and 2 Indonesian police officers. Approximately 180–310 others were injured from the disaster in early reports, but Effendy's report stated that 323 others were injured in the disaster, including 21 who were in serious conditions. Until 24 October 2022, the reported number of casualties have been adjusted to 135 fatalities and 583 injuries, became the second deadliest incident in association football worldwide, and the deadliest in Asia, Indonesia and the eastern hemisphere.

As a result of this disaster, all Liga 1 matches were suspended for initially a week, but were extended to 2 weeks with addition of Liga 2 matches, until the joint fact-finding team decided to suspend all PSSI leagues until the president's approval of normalization was approved. The Football Association of Indonesia banned Arema for hosting home matches until the end of the season, with further life bans from PSSI Disciplinary Commission to Arema FC match organizing committee Abdul Haris and Arema security officer Suko Sutrisno being issued. Additionally, Arema was also banned from holding matches with spectators as host, and their matches had to be held far from Malang home base being also issued. Indonesian president Joko Widodo instructed the association to suspend all Liga 1 matches until "evaluation of improvement of security procedures" was carried out. The decision to hold the match by the organizer of Liga 1 was agreed by shareholders. Compensations for victims who affected in this disaster was provided by Governor of East Java Khofifah Indar Parawansa, with compensation for deceased's relatives being 10 million rupiah (US$698.9), and injured victims being 5 million rupiah (US$349.45).

Investigations toward Indonesian police were issued after the disaster: the usage of tear gas by the police was also in scrutiny by National Commission on Human Rights of Indonesia and Deputy Chairman of Commission III of the DPR-RI Ahmad Sahroni because their usage was prohibited according to FIFA, with further request from Sahroni to National Police Chief General Listyo Sigit Prabowo to take firm action against the officers responsible for the use of tear gas. As a response to their request, the chief of regional police defended its use, citing the threats posed by the rioters to team's players and officials, however they also stated that they would evaluate the use of tear gas. A joint fact-finding team headed by Coordinating Minister for Political, Legal and Security Affairs Mahfud MD and Minister of Youth and Sports Zainudin Amali was also formed, but none from Football Association of Indonesia joined. On 6 October 2022, Prabowo announced 6 suspects responsible for the disaster: the organizer of the Liga 1, Arema head of security officer, Arema match organising committee for negligence and 3 police officers for tear gas usage.

Legal proceedings from third party organizations were also issued: the Institute for Security and Strategic Studies (ISESS), an Indonesian defence and security think tank, and the Indonesian Police Watch (IPW) ordered to dismiss the Malang police chief, Adjunct Chief Commissioner Ferli Hidayat, with further calls for dismissal of the East Java police chief Inspector General Nico Afinta in the ISESS side, and the request for Afinta to bring the organizers of the match to trial in the IPW side. As the result, Prabowo dismissed Hidayat and 9 officers from East Java Mobile Brigade Corps on 3 October 2022.

FIFA announced that they would not issue any sanctions to PSSI, instead they would work with AFC and PSSI to establish security procedures and standards in comply to international standards. They will discuss to local football clubs and experts for suggestions, advices and commitments, re-assess the schedule and performing risk–benefit analysis. A special office in Indonesia was also established. FIFA also agreed with Indonesian government to reforming the system, infrastructure, football standards and fan culture to ensure that all aspects in Indonesian football is comply to FIFA standards, while managing the run of 2023 FIFA U-20 World Cup as scheduled with the government. In addition, Joko Widodo also issued orders to rebuilt Kanjuruhan Stadium according to FIFA standards.

Results

Official match results 
Data incomplete

The record counts all competitions (league, official tournament and pre-season tournament).

Players in both teams
Note: 
 Players in bold are still active

Moving from Arema to Persebaya

Moving from Persebaya to Arema

Head coaches who coached for both clubs

Honours

Notes

References

External links 
 Arema F.C. Official website
 Persebaya Official website
 Arema F.C. at Liga 1 website
 Persebaya at Liga 1 website

Arema F.C.
Persebaya Surabaya
Football rivalries in Indonesia
Football in Indonesia
Liga 1 (Indonesia)
East Java